Suri (Aymara and Quechua for rhea) is a mountain in the Andes of southern Peru, about  high. It is situated in the Puno Region, El Collao Province, Santa Rosa District. Suri lies northeast of the lake Wilaquta and the mountain Chinchillani.

References

Mountains of Puno Region
Mountains of Peru